Rungsianea is a genus of moths of the family Noctuidae.

Species
 Rungsianea fontainei  Viette, 1967
 Rungsianea hecate  (Viette, 1960)

References

Hadeninae
Moth genera
Taxa named by Pierre Viette